José Moirt (born 16 October 1965) is a Mauritian weightlifter. He competed in the men's light heavyweight event at the 1988 Summer Olympics.

References

1965 births
Living people
Mauritian male weightlifters
Olympic weightlifters of Mauritius
Weightlifters at the 1988 Summer Olympics
Place of birth missing (living people)